The Tragus or Tragos is a river of northwestern Arcadia and southern Achaea, Greece. It is a left tributary of the Ladon river. Its source is near the village of Nymfasia, it flows along Dara, and joins the Ladon near Zevgolatio.

Background 
The ancient author Pausanias wrote that the river issues from the inner side of the embankment surrounding the city of Caphyae near lake Orchomenus, after which it descends into a chasm of the earth, issuing again at a place called Nasi; and that the name of the village where it issues is named Rheunus. Older names of the Tragus are Tara and Daraiiko.

References

Landforms of Achaea
Rivers of Peloponnese (region)
Rivers of Western Greece
Rivers of Greece